Rajiv Anchal (born 20 December 1956) is a film director, screenwriter, and sculptor who works in Malayalam language cinema. In 1997, he made Guru, India's official submission for the Academy Award for Best Foreign Language Film. His first English language film was Beyond The Soul (2003).

Sculptor 
He contributed to the construction of the Parnashala at the Santhigiri Ashram and the large Jatayu bird sculpture in Jatayu Earth’s Center, Chadayamangalam, Kollam.

Filmography
 Butterflies (1993)
 Kashmeeram (1994)
 Guru (1997)
 Rushy Vamsam (1999)
 Pilots (2000) (also as writer)
 Beyond the Soul (2002) (also as writer and producer)
 Nothing But Life (2004) (also as writer) / Made in USA
 Paattinte Palazhy (2010)

References

External links
 

Living people
Malayalam film directors
Artists from Kollam
People from Kollam district
Malayalam screenwriters
Malayalam film producers
Indian male sculptors
Indian art directors
Film directors from Kerala
20th-century Indian sculptors
21st-century Indian sculptors
Film producers from Kerala
21st-century Indian film directors
20th-century Indian film directors
21st-century Indian dramatists and playwrights
Screenwriters from Kerala
1956 births
21st-century Indian screenwriters
20th-century Indian male artists
21st-century Indian male artists